Berció is one of 28 parishes (administrative divisions) in the municipality of Grado, within the province and autonomous community of Asturias, in northern Spain.

The population is 85 (INE 2007).

Villages and hamlets
El lado (El Llau)
La Vallina

References 

Parishes in Grado